Eline Vandersteen (born ) is a Belgian female artistic gymnast, representing her nation at international competitions. 

She competed at world championships, including the 2014 World Artistic Gymnastics Championships in  Nanning, China.

References

External links
 http://www.gymnasticsresults.com/2008/leverkusen2008.html?no_redirect=true
 https://www.usagym.org/pages/post.html?PostID=2512&prog=e
 http://www.intlgymnast.com/index.php?option=com_content&view=article&id=2732:top-gymnasts-face-pre-worlds-challenge-in-ghent&catid=2:news&Itemid=53
https://thegymter.net/category/eline-vandersteen/
https://www.youtube.com/watch?v=G7Z3kyv8e3o

1995 births
Living people
Belgian female artistic gymnasts
Place of birth missing (living people)
Gymnasts at the 2010 Summer Youth Olympics